Daai Yuk was a Chan Buddhist master who is credited with teaching Southern Dragon Kung Fu, or Lung Ying 龍形拳, to Lam Yiu Gwai. He was a monk at Wa Sau Toi, one of the many temples on the sacred mountain Luofushan.

References

Chan Buddhist monks
Qing dynasty Buddhists
Chinese martial artists